The Wandelen is a mountain of the Urner Alps, overlooking Lake Sarnen in the canton of Obwalden. It lies at the northern end of the chain between the Klein Melchtal and the Melchtal.

References

External links
 Wandelen on Hikr

Mountains of the Alps
Mountains of Obwalden
Mountains of Switzerland